The Manipur Women's League, also the AMFA Senior Women's Football League is the top division of women's football league in the Indian state of Manipur. It is also known as the A. Shanta Meetei Memorial Senior Women's Football League (earlier the BM Singh Trophy until the 2021–22 season) since the 2022–23 season. The League is organised by the All Manipur Football Association (AMFA), the official football governing body of the state.

Venue
The matches are held at various stadiums inc Khuman Lampak Main Stadium, Artificial turf, Khurai Lamlong at Imphal.

Clubs

2022–23 season
The teams participating in the 2022–23 season:

Champions

References

Women's football leagues in India
Football in Manipur